The Avia 51 was a 1930s Czechoslovakian six-passenger commercial transport, designed by Robert Nebesář and built by Avia. The type was uneconomical in use and only three were built.

Development
The Avia 51 was a three-engined high-wing cantilever monoplane designed for the Czech national airlines CLS. It was built with a duraluminium monocoque fuselage and a fixed tailwheel landing gear. Powered by three Avia Rk.12 radial engines, two were fitted into the leading edges of the wing and one was nose-mounted. It had a two-man flight deck and an enclosed luxury cabin for five or six passengers which was not large enough to stand up (5 ft 1in), but did have a separate lavatory compartment, it also had three luggage and mail compartments.

Operational history
The Avia 51 entered service on the Berlin-Prague-Vienna route, but with only a small passenger capacity it proved uneconomical to operate. In 1937 the aircraft were sold to the Estonian government One appeared operating for the Spanish Republican Air Force in the Spanish Civil War, and it was reported that the other two were lost at sea when the freighter carrying them to Bilbao was sunk.

Operators

Spanish Republican Air Force

Specifications

See also

References

Notes

Bibliography

1930s Czechoslovakian airliners
Trimotors
51
High-wing aircraft
Aircraft first flown in 1933